SL Agritech Corporation (SLAC) is the leading research development and production of hybrid rice company in the Philippines.

Background
It is a subsidiary company of Sterling Paper Group of Companies which was founded by Henry Lim Bon Liong in 1998. Inspired by the way China solved its food shortage and becoming a surplus exporter afterwards, Henry obtained assistance of Prof. Yuan Long Ping to develop a hybrid rice that would suit the farming conditions in the country. Its primary purpose is to promote the development, commercialization, and growth of hybrid rice technology as well as bring employment and entrepreneurship to the rural areas in the country.

From its former land provided by the government of Laguna, it is now in the 40-hectare land in Barangay Oogong, Santa Cruz, Laguna, serving as its research and breeding complex. In April 2000, its first hybrid rice seeds were harvested (Mestizo A line and F1 Mestizo hybrid rice seeds). Its production led to an agreement between SLAC and the Department of Agriculture through the representation of PHILRICE. SLAC then established its first major seed production base at Banaybanay, Davao Oriental.

The development of hybrid rice SL-8 in 2002 marked the business growth of SLAC. It is now the major distributor and exporter of hybrid rice throughout the country and to other countries like Malaysia, Singapore, and Indonesia.

Affiliates
SL Agrifoods Corporation
SL Biotech Corporation
Doña Maria Rice Surprise

See also
 Henry Lim Bon Liong

References

External links
"SL Agritech Corporation." (accessed on December 11, 2007).

Food and drink companies of the Philippines
Companies based in Makati